Mos Teutonicus (Latin for "German custom") was a postmortem funerary custom used in Europe in the Middle Ages as a means of transporting, and solemnly disposing of, the bodies of high status individuals. Nobles would often undergo Mos Teutonicus since their burial plots were often located far away from their place of death. The process involved the removal of the flesh from the body, so that the bones of the deceased could be transported hygienically from distant lands back home.

Background 

Nobles during the middle ages often had specific burial locations that were far away from their place of death. They often wanted their hearts to be buried at their homes, thus their bodies had to travel far distances. King Charlemagne outlawed cremation, deeming destruction of the bones as destruction of the soul. Anyone who cremated a person's bones was subject to the death penalty. Thus, the practice of Mos Teutonicus came about as a way to preserve the bones over long distances without destroying them.  Mos Teutonicus can even be seen being practiced in the 10th and 11th centuries during the rule of the Holy Roman Empire. Examples of this include rulers from the Ottone and Salian dynasties in which the rulers were transported to burial locations far from their place of death.

During the Second Crusade for the Holy Land it was not thought fit for aristocrats who fell in battle, or died of natural causes, to be buried away from their homeland in Muslim territory. The transportation of the whole body over long distances was impractical and unhygienic due to decomposition. Mos Teutonicus was especially important in warmer climates, such as around the Mediterranean Sea, since the body was subject to faster decay.

German aristocrats were particularly concerned that burial should not take place in the Holy Land, but rather on home soil. The Florentine chronicler Boncompagno was the first to connect the procedure specifically with German aristocrats, and coins the phrase Mos Teutonicus, meaning 'the Germanic custom'.

English and French aristocrats generally preferred embalming to Mos Teutonicus, involving the burial of the entrails and heart in a separate location from the corpse. One of the advantages of Mos Teutonicus was that it was relatively economical in comparison with embalming, and was more hygienic.

Corpse preservation was very popular in medieval society. The decaying body was seen as representative of something sinful and evil.  Embalming and Mos Teutonicus, along with tomb effigies, were a way of giving the corpse an illusion of stasis and removed the uneasy image of putrification and decay.

In 1270, the body of King Louis IX, who died in Tunis, which was Muslim territory, was subject to the process of Mos Teutonicus for its transportation back to France.

Process 
The process of Mos Teutonicus began with the cadaver being dismembered to facilitate the next stage in the process, in which the body parts were boiled in water, wine, milk, or vinegar for several hours. The boiling had the effect of separating the flesh from the bone. The heart and intestines needed to be removed in order to allow for proper transfer of the bones. Any residual was scraped from the bones, leaving a completely clean skeleton. Both the flesh and internal organs could be buried immediately, or preserved with salt in the same manner as animal meat. The bones could then be sprinkled with perfumes or fragrances. The bones, and any preserved flesh, would then be transported back to the deceased's home for ceremonial interment.

Mediaeval society generally regarded entrails as ignoble and there was no great solemnity attached to their disposal, especially among German aristocrats.

Prohibition of the practice 
Although the Church had a high regard for the practice, Pope Boniface VIII was known to have an especial repugnance of Mos Teutonicus because of his ideal of bodily integrity. In his bull of 1300, De Sepulturis, Boniface forbade the practice. The papal bull issued which banned this practice was often misinterpreted as prohibition against human dissection. This may have hindered anatomical research, if anatomists feared repercussions and punishment as a result of medical autopsies, but De Sepulturis only prohibited the act of Mos Teutonicus, not dissection in general (medieval physicians were known to have widely practiced dissection and autopsy, though most had an assistant perform the actual incisions and manipulations of cadavers). The practice of Mos Teutonicus eventually stopped in the 15th century.

Bio-archeological effects 
The process or Mos Teutonicus often did not produce clean cuts during de-fleshing. As a result, it is noticed that nobles that had their bodies undergo Mos Teutonicus have cut marks on their bones from the de-fleshing process. Mos Teutonicus was also able to preserve the bones of higher class individuals better than lower class individuals.  The bones would not have been subject to outside elements so there is limited evidence of perhaps chew marking from animals.  In addition, the bones were not subject to flesh decay and were boiled in either water or wine, preventing further degradation. Thus, the bones of higher class individuals were better preserved than lower class individuals.

See also 
 Excarnation

Notes

References

Further reading 
 
 

Crusades
Death customs
Archaeology of death
Ritual
Traditions
Commemoration
Cultural aspects of death